is a Japanese video game music composer and keyboardist who works for Sega. He is among the oldest of the Sega sound team members, and one of the few from the 1980s still active today. He joined Sega in 1984 as a programmer, but quit the job and became a composer the following year.

He is also known as Hiro, Master Hiro (Hiro師匠) and Hiroshi Miyauchi (宮内 博史) (his pre-mukoyōshi name), and has been a part of both the S.S.T. Band and the sound unit [H.], the latter of which he leads. He has also been a member of Chain Band, a hybrid between the groups [H.] and Sonic Adventure Music Experience.

He worked closely with game designer Yu Suzuki and served as composer for some of the company's most recognized series, such as Space Harrier, Out Run, and After Burner, and has contributed music to many others. He has often acted as a tutor to new Sega composers, such as Yasuhiro Takagi and Keitaro Hanada.

Works

References

1965 births
Japanese composers
Japanese male composers
Japanese keyboardists
Living people
Musicians from Chiba Prefecture
Sega people
Video game composers